Jowita Wrzesień (born 8 December 1993) is a Polish freestyle wrestler. She won one of the bronze medals in the women's 59kg event at the 2022 World Wrestling Championships held in Belgrade, Serbia. She won the silver medal in the women's 59kg event at the 2022 European Wrestling Championships held in Budapest, Hungary.

Career 

At the 2019 World Wrestling Championships held in Nur-Sultan, Kazakhstan, she lost her bronze medal match against Iryna Kurachkina of Belarus in the women's freestyle 57 kg event.

In March 2021, she competed at the European Qualification Tournament in Budapest, Hungary and qualified for the 2020 Summer Olympics in Tokyo, Japan. Three months later, she won one of the bronze medals in her event at the 2021 Poland Open held in Warsaw, Poland.

She represented Poland at the 2020 Summer Olympics in Tokyo, Japan. She competed in the women's 57kg event where she was eliminated in her first match by Evelina Nikolova of Bulgaria. Two months later, she was eliminated in her first match in the women's 59 kg event at the 2021 World Wrestling Championships held in Oslo, Norway.

In February 2022, she won one of the bronze medals in the women's 59kg event at the Yasar Dogu Tournament held in Istanbul, Turkey. In March 2022, she won the silver medal in the 59kg event at the European Wrestling Championships held in Budapest, Hungary. In the final, she lost against Anastasia Nichita of Moldova. A few months later, she won the silver medal in her event at the Matteo Pellicone Ranking Series 2022 held in Rome, Italy. She won one of the bronze medals in the women's 59kg event at the 2022 World Wrestling Championships held in Belgrade, Serbia.

Achievements

References

External links 

1993 births
Living people
People from Będzin
Polish female sport wrestlers
Olympic wrestlers of Poland
Wrestlers at the 2020 Summer Olympics
World Wrestling Championships medalists
European Wrestling Championships medalists
European Games competitors for Poland
Wrestlers at the 2019 European Games
21st-century Polish women